Smithfield's Chicken 'N Bar-B-Q is a quick service restaurant chain in North Carolina serving fried chicken and Eastern North Carolina barbecue, with  39 locations country-wide, as of May 1, 2020. It has more than 39 locations in the state, as well as an online store.

What is now Smithfield's Chicken 'N Bar-B-Q was opened by Junius and Maggie Moore in downtown Smithfield, North Carolina in 1977 as Smithfield Bar-B-Q, soon followed by a second restaurant in nearby Clayton, NC.. The business expanded in 1979 to Salter Path.
 
Starting in the early 1980s, the company opened additional restaurants in eastern North Carolina, and expanded to the Raleigh-Durham area in the 1990s.

Controversy
In April 2017, the Raleigh Police Protective Association accused employees and a manager of the Smithfield's location in Garner, North Carolina of singing "Fuck tha Police" while officers dined there. An investigation determined that nobody in the restaurant sang, and that the actual incident consisted of a single employee mouthing the words, "fuck the police", to two police officers at the counter. The police officers told a friend who later posted an incorrect account on Facebook.

See also
 List of chicken restaurants

References

Companies based in North Carolina
Fast-food chains of the United States
Fast-food franchises
Restaurants established in 1964
Barbecue restaurants in the United States
Regional restaurant chains in the United States
Poultry restaurants
1964 establishments in North Carolina
Johnston County, North Carolina
Chicken chains of the United States